Philip Chijoke Ejimadu (born August 31, 1999) is an American soccer player.

Career

Club 
Ejimadu played in the youth academy of Nacional Atlético Clube in São Paulo, Brazil before returning to the United States to go pro. He signed with Major League Soccer outfit, Los Angeles FC on February 21, 2019. On March 29, 2019, Ejimadu went on a season-long loan to third-division, FC Tucson. The next day, Ejimadu made his professional debut for FC Tucson starting the entire match in a 3–1 victory at Orlando City B.

On September 23, 2020, Ejimadu moved on loan to USL Championship side San Diego Loyal.

On April 5, 2021, Ejimadu joined Las Vegas Lights FC ahead of the 2021 season.

International 
Ejimadu is eligible to represent Brazil, Nigeria, and the United States on the international level. In 2018, he was called into the training camp for the United States under-20 national team.

References

External links 
 

1999 births
Living people
American sportspeople of Brazilian descent
American sportspeople of Nigerian descent
American expatriate soccer players
American expatriates in Brazil
Association football goalkeepers
Expatriate footballers in Brazil
FC Tucson players
Los Angeles FC players
Nacional Atlético Clube (SP) players
San Diego Loyal SC players
Las Vegas Lights FC players
Soccer players from Minnesota
USL League One players
American soccer players
United States men's under-20 international soccer players
Sportspeople from Minneapolis
MLS Next Pro players